J. Thompson Baker House is located in Wildwood, Cape May County, New Jersey, United States. The building was built in 1909 and added to the National Register of Historic Places on May 31, 1996.  It was owned by J. Thompson Baker, a real estate developer and politician who served as mayor of Wildwood, New Jersey and a member of Congress.

See also
National Register of Historic Places listings in Cape May County, New Jersey

References

Houses on the National Register of Historic Places in New Jersey
Houses in Cape May County, New Jersey
Wildwood, New Jersey
National Register of Historic Places in Cape May County, New Jersey
New Jersey Register of Historic Places